The white-ringed flycatcher (Conopias albovittatus) is a species of bird in the family Tyrannidae.

It is found in Colombia, Costa Rica, Ecuador, Honduras, and Panama.

Its natural habitats are subtropical or tropical moist lowland forests and heavily degraded former forest.

References

white-ringed flycatcher
Birds of Honduras
Birds of Nicaragua
Birds of Costa Rica
Birds of Panama
Birds of the Tumbes-Chocó-Magdalena
white-ringed flycatcher
Taxonomy articles created by Polbot